Transpiranto is a parody language, a caricature of the international auxiliary language Esperanto. The name contains a play on the Swedish verb transpirera, to perspire. The parody language was developed from 1929 by contributors to the publication Grönköpings Veckoblad ('the Greenville Weekly', a Swedish satirical monthly), through a series of comical translations of well-known Scandinavian songs and poems, more than 200 in all. The first two Transpiranto poems were written by Nils Hasselskog.

In recent years, several poems originally written in Esperanto have been rendered into Transpiranto by Martin Weichert, and have been published in the Swedish Esperanto journal La Espero, and via the internet. 

Texts in Transpiranto consist of short phrases taken straight from English, German, French, Spanish, Italian and Latin, alternating with more strictly Esperanto-like fragments, and with Swedish slang.

Esperanto and Transpiranto have been compared by the linguist Bengt Sigurd, a contributor to a Swedish anthology about language issues.

See also 
 Esperanto
 Europanto

References

External links 
 An article about Transpiranto, with example poems at  Martin Weichert's site 
 Titles of Transpiranto poems published in Grönköpings Veckoblad 1929; 1969-1970; 1976-83 
 Titles of Transpiranto poems published in Grönköpings Veckoblad 1984-2003 
 Six otherwise unpublished Transpiranto poems, with short introduction 
 Several transpiranto translations of Swedish poems and songs 

Artistic languages
Swedish humour
Constructed languages introduced in the 1920s
1929 introductions